(also rendered shimpa) is a form of theater in Japan, usually featuring melodramatic stories, contrasted with the more traditional kabuki style. It later spread to cinema.

Art form
The roots of Shinpa can be traced to a form of agitation propaganda theater in the 1880s promoted by Liberal Party members Sadanori Sudo and Otojirō Kawakami. Theatre historians have characterized Shinpa as a transitional movement, closely associated with the Meiji restoration, whose primary rationale was the rejection of "old" values in favor of material that would appeal to a partially westernized urban middle class which still maintained some traditional habits of thought.  Some of the innovations associated with Shinpa included: shortened performance times, the occasional re-introduction of female performers to the stage, the abolition of teahouses that had previously controlled ticket sales, the use of contemporary patriotic events as subject matter, and the frequent adaptation of western classics, such as the plays of Shakespeare and The Count of Monte Cristo.

It eventually earned the name "shinpa" (literally meaning "new school") to contrast it from "kyūha" ("old school" or kabuki) due its more contemporary and realistic stories. With the success of the Seibidan troupe, however, shinpa theater ended up with a form that was closer to kabuki than to the later shingeki because of its continued use of onnagata and off-stage music. As a theatrical form, it was most successful in the early 1900s as the works of novelists such as Kyōka Izumi, Kōyō Ozaki, and Roka Tokutomi were adapted for the stage. With the introduction of cinema in Japan, shinpa became one of the first film genres in opposition again to kyūha films, as many films were based on shinpa plays.

Spread to cinema
Some shinpa stage actors like Masao Inoue were heavily involved in film, and a form called rensageki or literally "chain drama" appeared which mixed cinema and theater on stage. With the rise of the reformist Pure Film Movement in the 1910s, which strongly criticized shinpa films for their melodramatic tales of women suffering from the strictures of class and social prejudice, films about contemporary subjects eventually were called gendaigeki in opposition to jidaigeki by the 1920s, even though shinpa stories continued to be made into film for decades to come. On the stage, shinpa was no longer as successful after the Taishō era, but good playwrights such as Matsutarō Kawaguchi, actresses like Yaeko Mizutani and such Living National Treasures as Rokurō Kitamura and Shōtarō Hanayagi helped keep the form alive. Shinpa also had an influence on modern Korean theater through the shinp’a (신파) genre.

See also
 Theatre of Japan
 Cinema of Japan

Notes

External links
 Gekidan Shinpa official page (in Japanese)

Theatrical genres
Theatre in Japan
History of film of Japan
Film genres